Juhan Kunder (26 December 1852 Holstre Parish, Viljandi County – 24 April 1888) was an Estonian poet, playwright, author of natural history textbooks, and folklore collector.

From 1872 to 1875 he attended Tartu Teachers' Seminary.

From 1873 he was a member of Estonian Students' Society. He was also a member of Society of Estonian Literati, being its deputy president between 1882 and 1888. He was also active in Alexander School movement.

He did collaborations for several Estonian newspaper and magazine, including Postimees, Sakala, Valgus, and Meelejahutaja.

He died in 1888 because of typhus. He is buried at Rakvere Cemetery.

Selected works
 1873: poetry collection "Õie-kuu ja külm elu maanteel"
 1884: children's book "Laste raamat"
 poem "Munamäel" ('On Munamägi Mountain')

References

1852 births
1888 deaths
Estonian male poets
Estonian dramatists and playwrights
Estonian children's writers
19th-century Estonian writers
Estonian folklorists
People from Viljandi Parish